The 1995 East Carolina Pirates football team was an American football team that represented East Carolina University as an independent during the 1995 NCAA Division I-A football season. In their fourth season under head coach Steve Logan, the team compiled a 9–3 record and won the 1995 Liberty Bowl. The Pirates offense scored 274 points while the defense allowed 226 points.

Schedule

Roster

Team players drafted into the NFL

Game summaries

Tennessee

Syracuse

Central Michigan

Illinois

West Virginia

Cincinnati

Temple

SMU

Army

Tulsa

Memphis

1995 Liberty Bowl

References

East Carolina
East Carolina Pirates football seasons
Liberty Bowl champion seasons
East Carolina Pirates football